Dominique Bellion (born 25 August 1948 in Saint-Flour, Cantal) is  a French civil servant.
He has served as prefect of several Departments of France.

Dominique Bellion is the son  of Roger Bellion (1914-1986), a civil servant (prefect) who was also a writer and poet using the pseudonym Roger Rabiniaux.

Career
 On 1991: prefect of Mayenne in Laval.
 On 1994: prefect of Aude in Carcassonne.
 On 1998: prefect of Martinique in Fort-de-France. 
 On 2000: prefect of Allier in Moulins. 
 On 2003: prefect of Dordogne in Périgueux. 
 On 2005: prefect of Gard in Nîmes.
 On 2009: prefect of Meurthe-et-Moselle in Nancy.

Prefect of Martinique he was criticized by Prime Minister Lionel Jospin in October 1999 (strikes...).

Honours and awards
: Chevalier of the Legion of Honour
: Chevalier of the National Order of Merit

See also 
 List of colonial and departmental heads of Martinique

References
   "Bellion, Dominique, Sylvain, Gabriel" (prefect, born 1948), pages 240 and 241 in  Who’s Who in France : Dictionnaire biographique de personnalités françaises vivant en France et à l’étranger, et de personnalités étrangères résidant en France, 44th edition pour 2013 printed  in 2012, 2371 p., 31 cm,  .
  http://www.whoswho.fr/bio/dominique-bellion_21790 : Who's Who in France on line (fee). Retrieved on 16 February 2013. 
  https://web.archive.org/web/20140112233359/http://www.acteurspublics.com/personnalite/15659/dominique-bellion . Retrieved 10 May 2013.
  His page on the Gard prefecture's website
  http://www.liberation.fr/politiques/0101296876-en-guadeloupe-jospin-respire-apres-s-etre-fache-en-martinique-il-a-lance-un-rappel-a-l-ordre-aux-chefs-d-entr, site of Libération: Guiral Antoine, "En Guadeloupe, Jospin respire... après s'être fâché en Martinique. Il a lancé un rappel à l'ordre aux chefs d'entreprise.", 30 October 1999. Retrieved 24 May 2013.

Notes

Living people
1948 births
People from Cantal
Prefects of Mayenne
Prefects of Aude
Prefects of Martinique
Prefects of Allier
Prefects of Dordogne
Prefects of Gard
Prefects of Meurthe-et-Moselle
Chevaliers of the Légion d'honneur
Knights of the Ordre national du Mérite